"Eesti Kullafond" ('Estonian Gold Foundation') is a series of albums of Estonian classic artists. The albums are recorded by Hitivabrik.

Albums
 Tõnis Mägi (2000, 2CD, HFCD024)
 Tarmo Pihlap (2000, 3CD, HFCD030)
 Mati Nuude (2001, 3CD, HFCD034)
 Ivo Linna (2001, 3CD, HFCD036)
 Vello Orumets (2001, 3CD, HFCD044)
 Gunnar Graps (2002, 3CD, HFCD053)
 Kuldne Trio (2002, 3CD, HFCD055)
 Silvi Vrait (2002, 3CD, HFCD066)
 Joel Friedrich Steinfeldt (2003, 3CD, HFCD074)
 Arne Oit (2003, 2CD, HFCD075)
 Raimond Valgre (2003, 2CD, HFCD082)
 Alo Mattiisen (2004, 3CD, HFCD093)
 Georg Ots (2004, 2CD, HFCD095)
 Karl Madis (2004, 3CD, HFCD096)
 Mait Maltis (2004, 3CD, HFCD098)
 Heli Lääts (2004, 3CD, HFCD101)
 Singer Vinger (2005, 2CD+DVD, HFCD105)
 Anne Veski (2006, 3CD, HFCD107)
 Helgi Sallo (2006, 2CD, HFCD111)
 Kukerpillid (2007, 3CD, HFCD112)
 Olav Ehala (2007, 2CD, HFCD113)
 Kustas Kikerpuu (2007, 2CD, HFCD115)
 Heidy Tamme (2008, 3CD, HFCD119)
 Horoskoop (2008, 3CD, HFCD121)
 Albert Uustulnd (2008, CD+DVD, HFCD122)
 Apelsin (2009, 3CD)
 Artur Rinne (2009, 3CD)
 Jam (2009, 3CD)
 Eino Baskin (2009, 3CD)
 Kalmer Tennosaar (2010, 3CD)
 Eesti Filmimuusika (2010, 2CD)
 Onu Bella (2011, 2CD+DVD)
 Lindpriid (2011, 3CD)
 Lastelaulud (2012, 2CD)
 Folkmill (2012, 3CD)
 Voldemar Kuslap (2012, 2CD)
 Riho Sibul (2012, 3CD)
 Karavan (2013, 3CD)
 Lastele, muinasjutud (2013, 3CD)
 Kihnu Virve (2014, 3CD)
 Polyphon & Consilium (2014, 2CD+DVD)
 Boris Lehtlaan (2014, 3CD)
 Lastele (2015, 3CD)
 Henry Laks (2015, 3CD)
 Untsakad (2015, 3CD)
 Marju Länik (2017, 3CD)
 Rein Rannap (2018, 3CD)

References

Estonian-language albums